Cerro Gordo Township may refer to the following townships in the United States:

 Cerro Gordo Township, Piatt County, Illinois
 Cerro Gordo Township, Lac qui Parle County, Minnesota